Ash Creek or Ashcreek may refer to:

Waterways

In the United States
Ash Creek (Arizona), in Arizona
Ash Creek (Connecticut), a salt water estuary in Connecticut
Ash Creek (Minnesota), a tributary of the Rock River
Ash Creek (Niobrara River tributary), a stream in Rock and Holt Counties, Nebraska
Ash Creek (Polk County, Oregon), a tributary of the Willamette River
Ash Creek (California), a tributary of the Pit River
Ash Creek (Utah), a tributary of the Virgin River

Communities

In the United States
Ash Creek Township, Ellsworth County, Kansas, a township in Kansas
Ash Creek, Minnesota, an unincorporated community in Minnesota
Ashcreek, Portland, Oregon, a city neighborhood

Other uses
Ash Creek (meteorite), Meteorite fall in Texas, USA